The National Assembly (Al-Maǧlis al-Waṭaniy) is the lower house of the National Legislature of Sudan. The Legislature was unicameral until 2005. The upper house is the Council of States (Majlis Welayat).

The National Assembly was dissolved on 11 April 2019 following a military coup which overthrew Sudan President Omar al-Bashir and Assembly's ruling National Congress Party.

As part of the 2019 Sudanese transition to democracy, a Transitional Legislative Council is to be formed which will function as the legislature of Sudan until elections scheduled for 2022.

Speakers
Hassan Abdallah al-Turabi was the speaker from 1996 until he stripped of the post in December 1999, and placed under arrest after a falling out with President Omar al-Bashir.

2015-2019 session

The most recent session was elected in 2015.

2010-2015 session

Sudan was previously in a transitional period following the signing of a Comprehensive Peace Agreement (CPA) on 9 January 2005 that officially ended the civil war between the Sudanese Government (based in Khartoum) and the southern-based Sudan People's Liberation Movement (SPLM) rebel group. The National Assembly consisted of 450 appointed members who represent the government, former rebels, and other opposition political parties. The National Assembly, whose members were appointed in mid-2005 replaced the latest elected parliament. All members of the National Legislature serve six-year terms. Article 117 of the Interim Constitution called for the 450 members of the National Assembly to be appointed according to the following power-sharing formula:

National Congress Party (52%)
 49% to northerners

Other Arab political parties (14%)
Umma Party (Hizb al-Umma)
Democratic Unionist Party 
Sudanese Communist Party
Sudanese Ba'ath Party

Sudan People's Liberation Movement (28%)
 28% to southerners

Other Black political parties (6%)
United Democratic Sudan Forum
Union of Sudan African Parties 1
Union of Sudan African Parties 2
United Democratic Front
South Sudan Democratic Forum/ Democratic Forum for South Sudan
Sudan African National Union

Composition of the National Assembly following the 2010 election and the independence of South Sudan.

Parliament building 
The seat of the National Assembly is Omdurman, immediately north-west of the country's capital Khartoum. The building was designed in the style of brutalist architecture by the Romanian architect Cezar Lăzărescu and completed in 1978. It is located on the banks of the White Nile at the confluence with the Blue Nile near the old Omdurman bridge.

References

External links 

Politics of Sudan
Sudan
National Legislature (Sudan)
1948 establishments in Sudan
Brutalist architecture in Africa